{{Infobox book
| name          = Beaches
| image         = Beaches (novel).jpg
| caption = First edition
| author        = Iris Rainer Dart
| illustrator   = 
| cover_artist  = 
| country       = United States
| language      = English
| series        = 
| genre         = Fiction
| publisher     = Bantam Books
| pub_date      = June 1, 1985
| media_type    = Hardcover
| pages         = 276
| isbn          = 0-553-05081-8
| oclc          = 13124258
| preceded_by   = 
| followed_by   = I'll Be There (1991)
}}Beaches is a 1985 novel written by Iris Rainer Dart about two friends, struggling actress Cee Cee Bloom and the conventional Bertie White. The story follows them through their life as young girls until their mid-to-late 30s.

Film adaptationsBeaches'', a 1988 film starring Bette Midler. The character Bertie White was renamed to Hilary Whitney.
Lifetime did a contemporary remake starring Idina Menzel as CC Bloom and Nia Long as Hillary Whitney that premiered January 21, 2017.

External links
Author Interview with Iris R. Dart on Beaches

1985 American novels
American novels adapted into films